Tokio Marine Nichido Shakujii Gymnasium is an arena in Nerima, Tokyo, Japan. It is the home arena of the Tokio Marine Nichido Big Blue of the B.League, Japan's professional basketball league.

References

Basketball venues in Japan
Indoor arenas in Japan
Sports venues in Tokyo
Tokio Marine Nichido Big Blue